René Wolff (born 4 April 1978 in Erfurt) is an Olympic and world champion track cyclist from Germany.

Wolff specializes in the sprint, team sprint and keirin events and teamed up with multiple Olympic champion Jens Fiedler and Stefan Nimke to win the gold medal in the team sprint event at the 2004 Summer Olympics.

Since 2010 René Wolff is the national coach of the Dutch track cycling team.

External links
 Olympic achievements

1978 births
Living people
German male cyclists
Cyclists at the 2004 Summer Olympics
Olympic cyclists of Germany
Olympic gold medalists for Germany
Olympic bronze medalists for Germany
Sportspeople from Erfurt
Olympic medalists in cycling
German racing drivers
ADAC GT Masters drivers
Medalists at the 2004 Summer Olympics
UCI Track Cycling World Champions (men)
German track cyclists
People from Bezirk Erfurt
Cyclists from Thuringia

Nürburgring 24 Hours drivers
21st-century German people